This is a list of recording artists who have reached number one on Billboard magazine's Dance/Mix Show Airplay chart. Originally at the start, Billboard began ranking dance music based on radio airplay the week ending August 17, 2003, based on data from Nielsen Broadcast Data Systems, but it was modified in November 2011 to include Mainstream Top 40 and Rhythmic Top 40 stations that feature club mix shows in their programming.

All acts are listed alphabetically.
Solo artists are alphabetized by last name, groups by group name excluding "a," "an" and "the."
Each act's total of number-one U.S. dance airplay hits is shown after their name.
All artists who are mentioned in song credits are listed here; this includes one-time pairings of otherwise solo artists and those appearing as "featured".
Many dance artists and producers use aliases and pseudonyms - this list shows whichever artist name was used on the record.
Members of groups who reached number one are not listed here separately from their groups, unless they also hit number one as a solo artist.

A

B

C

D

E
Missy Elliott (1)
Brandi Emma (1)
Anabel Englund (3)
Enur (1)
 Ercola (1)
Ella Eyre (1)

F
Fergie (1)
Filo & Peri (1)
Flanders (1)
Flo Rida (1)
Luis Fonsi (1)
Foster the People (1)
Dillon Francis (1)
Nelly Furtado (1)
Fuse ODG (1)

G

H
H-Boogie (1)
Charlotte Haining (1)
Halsey (3)
Calvin Harris (12)
 Hayla (1)
Oliver Heldens (1)
Emma Hewitt (1)
Keri Hilson (1)
Hozier (1)
Hvme (1)
Chrissie Hynde (1)

I
Icona Pop (1)
Illenium (3)
Inna (1)

J
Felix Jaehn (1)
Erika Jayne (1)
Jay-Z (2)
Jeremih (1)
Jes (1)
Vika Jigulina (1)
Elton John (2)
Jonas Brothers (1)
Jax Jones (2)
Alexis Jordan (1)

K
Kaskade (3)
Kesha (1)
Khalid (1)
The Killers (1)
Kimbra (1)
The Knocks (1)
Matthew Koma (1)
Krewella (2)
Georgia Ku (1)
 Kx5 (1)

L

M

N
Natasja (1)
Nervo (1)
Ne-Yo (2)
John Newman (1)
 Never Dull (1)
Nico & Vinz (1)
Nina Sky (1)
NOTD (2)
Tina Novak (1)
Nyla (1)

O
Rita Ora (1)
Kelly Osbourne (1)
OutKast (1)

P

Q
Quavo (1)

R
 Ralphi (1)
Raye (2)
Regard (1)
Bebe Rexha (1)
Rihanna (12)
Riton (1)
Roc Project (2)
Mark Ronson (1)
Kelly Rowland (2)
ROZES (1)

S

T
The Temper Trap (1)
T.I. (1)
Tiësto (5)
Timbaland (1)
Justin Timberlake (4)
Tube & Berger (1)

U
Alisa Ueno (1)
Usher (2)

V
Despina Vandi (1)
Vula (1)

W
Emily Warren (1)
The Wanted (1)
The Weeknd (1)
Florence Welch (1)
Kanye West (1)
Hayley Williams of Paramore (1)
Michelle Williams (1)
Pharrell Williams (1)
Chris Willis (2)
Lilly Wood (& the Prick) (1)

Y
Yolanda Be Cool (1)
Young Thug (1)

Z
Zedd (5)

See also
List of number one dance airplay hits (United States)

Notes

References
Additional information can be found within Billboard's online archive services and print editions of the magazine.

Dance Airplay